North Gate is a census-designated place in Contra Costa County, California. The 2010 United States census reported North Gate's population was 679.

Geography
According to the United States Census Bureau, the CDP has a total area of 0.658 square miles (1.704 km), all of it land.

Demographics
At the 2010 census North Gate had a population of 679. The racial makeup of North Gate was 566 (83.4%) White, 1 (0.1%) African American, 0 (0.0%) Native American, 65 (9.6%) Asian, 0 (0.0%) Pacific Islander, 19 (2.8%) from other races, and 28 (4.1%) from two or more races. Hispanic or Latino of any race were 56 people (8.2%).

The whole population lived in households, no one lived in non-institutionalized group quarters and no one was institutionalized.

There were 258 households, 80 (31.0%) had children under the age of 18 living in them, 161 (62.4%) were opposite-sex married couples living together, 26 (10.1%) had a female householder with no husband present, 10 (3.9%) had a male householder with no wife present.  There were 9 (3.5%) unmarried opposite-sex partnerships, and 3 (1.2%) same-sex married couples or partnerships. 46 households (17.8%) were one person and 17 (6.6%) had someone living alone who was 65 or older. The average household size was 2.63.  There were 197 families (76.4% of households); the average family size was 2.98.

The age distribution was 149 people (21.9%) under the age of 18, 42 people (6.2%) aged 18 to 24, 107 people (15.8%) aged 25 to 44, 259 people (38.1%) aged 45 to 64, and 122 people (18.0%) who were 65 or older.  The median age was 48.0 years. For every 100 females, there were 84.0 males.  For every 100 females age 18 and over, there were 80.3 males.

There were 264 housing units at an average density of ,of which 258 were occupied, 230 (89.1%) by the owners and 28 (10.9%) by renters.  The homeowner vacancy rate was 0%; the rental vacancy rate was 0%.  613 people (90.3% of the population) lived in owner-occupied housing units and 66 people (9.7%) lived in rental housing units.

Education
It is in the Mount Diablo Unified School District.

References

Census-designated places in Contra Costa County, California
Census-designated places in California